Aphthona euphorbiae is a root-feeding flea beetle of the genus Aphthona. It is widely distributed throughout Europe, North Africa, the Caucasuses, Near East, Asia Minor, the southern part of West and
Mid Siberia and Kazakhstan. In Latvia it has been reported as a pest of flax Linum.

References

Alticini
Beetles of Europe
Beetles of Asia
Beetles described in 1781
Taxa named by Franz von Paula Schrank